Namur 174 may refer to one of two adjacent Indian reserves northwest of Fort McMurray in Alberta, Canada, both owned by the Fort McKay First Nation:

 Namur River 174A, to the northeast
 Namur Lake 174B, to the southwest